The Sulawesi cicadabird (Edolisoma morio) is a species of bird in the family Campephagidae. It is endemic to Sulawesi in Indonesia. Its natural habitats are subtropical or tropical moist lowland forests and subtropical or tropical moist montane forests. The species is placed in the reinstated genus Edolisoma by some authors and the nominate subspecies E. morio morio was suggested to be part of the Edolisoma tenuirostre complex in a molecular phylogenetic study by Pedersen et al. (2018).

References

Endemic birds of Sulawesi
Edolisoma
Birds described in 1843
Taxonomy articles created by Polbot